Robert Paul Prager (February 28, 1888 – April 5, 1918) was a German immigrant who was lynched in the United States during World War I as a result of anti-German sentiment. He had worked as a baker in southern Illinois and then as a laborer in a coal mine, settling in Collinsville, a center of mining. At a time of rising anti-German sentiment, he was rejected for membership in the Maryville, Illinois local of the United Mine Workers of America. Afterward he angered area mine workers by posting copies of his letter around town that complained of his rejection and criticized the local president.

A mob of 200 to 300 men forced Prager from his home in Collinsville, making him walk barefoot and wrapped in an American flag along Main Street, where they beat and harassed him. The police took him into custody, but the mob gained control again, taking him from the Collinsville City Hall and accusing Mayor John H. Siegel of being pro-German. Failing to find tar in order to tar and feather Prager, as the workers had done to other victims, leaders of the mob used a rope and hanged him to death at a prominent bluff outside town.

Eleven men were tried for Prager's murder but all were acquitted. Rumors were that Prager held socialist beliefs, which were considered suspect at the time. Men in the mob claimed he was planning to blow up the coal mine, but there was no evidence against him and he had not been charged with any crime.

Biography
Robert Paul Prager was born in Dresden, Germany on February 28, 1888. He emigrated to the United States in 1905, at the age of 17. First working as an itinerant baker, he was sentenced to a year in an Indiana reformatory for theft. When the United States declared war on Germany on April 6, 1917, Prager was living in St. Louis, Missouri.

Prager showed strong patriotism for his adopted country. He took out his first citizenship papers the day after Wilson's war speech on April 2, in order to start the naturalization process. He registered for the draft and tried to enlist in the US Navy. (Aliens were promised citizenship if they successfully served in the armed forces.)  Prager continuously displayed an American flag from his window. When his St. Louis landlord objected, Prager reported him to the police.

Prager was rejected by the Navy due to medical reasons. After moving briefly to other towns in Missouri and Illinois, he landed in nearby Collinsville in southern Illinois in the late summer of 1917. He first took a job baking for an Italian baker named Lorenzo Bruno. In early 1918, Prager learned of the high wartime wages that miners were earning and began working in a laborer's position at the Donk Brothers Coal and Coke Co. Mine #2 in nearby Maryville. But Prager was rejected for permanent membership as a mine worker in United Mine Workers of America Local 1802, perhaps due to his argumentative personality or suspected socialist beliefs.

Background: Labor issues in Collinsville
Coal mining was the lifeblood of Collinsville in 1918, with seven mines in production in or around the city. More than half the city's male working population was employed at the mines. The work also drew itinerant miners who had no familial anchors to the community. Many of the miners in this period were immigrants or had at least one parent who was an immigrant, and most were from European nations. The United Mine Workers of America (UMW) had five locals in the Collinsville area, and the miners dominated the community. Radical elements in the UMW unions caused a number of wildcat strike actions at Collinsville area coal mines in the summer and fall of 1917.

Almost concurrently with the wildcat strikes, a unionization strike at the St. Louis Lead Smelting and Refining plant (Lead Works) in Collinsville energized many of the coal miners and other union members in the community. The strike turned violent at times. In an unusual twist, Collinsville police officers and Madison County Sheriff's deputies, mostly former miners themselves, sided with the striking workers from the Lead Works and the coal miners who supported unionization. Industry owners hired strikebreakers, who were harassed by both union men and law enforcement officers on local streets and in streetcars.

The strike at the Lead Works resulted in social tensions similar to those that had preceded the East St. Louis Race Riots earlier in 1917. Owners had hired black workers to break strikes in that community. In Collinsville, ethnic white workers objected to the use of "imported" workers, and many of the workers hired to fill the non-union jobs at the Lead Works were black.

The wildcat coal mine strikes and unionization strike at St. Louis Louis Smelting and Refining resulted in radicalizing many Collinsville coal miners. They became empowered by the lack of official resistance to their actions in 1917-1918 by community leaders or local law enforcement.

Background: Wartime patriotism and paranoia
The federal Committee on Public Information (CPI) sought to gain support for U.S. entry into the Great War, which had raged in Europe since 1914. Many Americans had a largely isolationist viewpoint and believed they did not need to get involved in Europe's problems. At the same time, anarchists and socialists had largely opposed US entry into the war, in order to focus on solving domestic problems such as labor injustices and economic inequities. The CPI's campaign reached the newspapers and also produced buttons and posters to support the war effort, trying to raise patriotic support. The CPI also controlled the release of news and photographs of the war to newspapers and magazines.

Meanwhile, Congress had passed the Espionage Act of 1917, which criminalized actions that might interfere with the military or even military recruitment, such as making statements which could discourage potential soldiers from registering for the draft or enlisting. The Espionage Act also prohibited mailing of any materials which might harm the government's war efforts. This act was used broadly by the government to suppress anarchist and socialist activists, whom they opposed. There had been considerable labor and social unrest preceding US entry into the war.

Locally, many residents of Collinsville attended patriotic events, such as the June 5, 1917 National Draft Registration Day, or the March 27, 1918 organizing meeting of the Collinsville Neighborhood Committee of the Illinois State Council of Defense. Many immigrants and their descendants were eager to prove their loyalty to the United States. A number of Collinsville men had enlisted, while many more were drafted to report for military service starting in September 1917. But the city residents failed to meet Liberty Bond sales quotas for both bond drives in 1917. In November 1917, Leighton Evatt died from pneumonia in France, the first fatality of the war from Collinsville.

Nearly every club or organization in Collinsville conducted regular fundraising to support the soldiers or the military effort. The Red Cross became the leading war support organization locally, and would have nearly 4000 members by war's end. Though some residents complained about fuel and food conservation measures, most Collinsville people complied with the guidelines, not wanting to have their loyalty considered suspect.

Government propaganda urged residents to be on constant alert for enemy spies. The war raised the unease of native-born Americans about the numerous immigrants in the country. "Every German or Austrian in the United States, unless known by years of association to be absolutely loyal, should be treated as a potential spy," the Collinsville Advertiser newspaper reported on December 29, 1917. Because Germany was opposed to Great Britain and France, nationally ethnic Germans in the United States,  having previously been perhaps the most-respected immigrant groups, increasingly faced anti-German sentiment. Examples of anti-German sentiment were street names being changed and German-language classes dropped in many communities. Groups ranging from the All-Allied Anti-German League to the Boy Spies of America reported any activity they thought suspicious.

In the coal fields of southern Illinois, miners administered extralegal justice against real and perceived enemies: in a kind of charivari, they tarred and feathered some men, and drove others out of town through mob harassment. A Lutheran minister from a Collinsville-area church was forced to leave the community because he reportedly would not renounce his German citizenship. Throughout the nation, harassment of German immigrants and those of German descent peaked during early 1918.

Lynching of Robert Paul Prager
Prager's application to join UMW Local 1802 was rejected on April 3, 1918. After the union meeting that evening, miners paraded Prager near saloons in Maryville, then warned him to leave that town. Prager was angered to have been rejected by Local 1802 and losing his job. The next morning, he wrote a letter to the Maryville miners, complaining that he had been treated unfairly by Local 1802 President James Fornero. "I have been a union man all times and never once a scab [strikebreaker]," Prager said. He denied accusations that he was a German sympathizer. He wrote, "I am heart and soul for the good old USA. I am of German birth, of which accident I cannot help." On the afternoon of April 4 he posted copies of this letter near the Maryville mine and nearby saloons.

Leaving work at the end of the day, the Maryville miners were enraged to see copies of Prager's letter. A contingent of about six Maryville men went to Prager's Collinsville home in the 200 block of Vandalia Street, bringing along dozens of men who had been drinking in a nearby saloon. The men arrived at Prager's door about 9:45 p.m. and ordered him to leave town. Soon the group told Prager to come out first and kiss the flag to show his patriotism. Prager was told to remove his shoes; wrapped in the flag and barefoot, he was paraded along Main Street in Collinsville past numerous saloons where miners and other working men were drinking. Many joined the mob, which now numbered about 300. At approximately 10 p.m., three Collinsville policemen took Prager from the mob at Main and Seminary streets, and put him into the jail for his safety, in the basement of City Hall, three blocks away.

The mob reassembled on Main Street; several hundred men marched behind a US flag, singing "The Star Spangled Banner" (a popular song that was not designated as the national anthem until 1931). They stopped at the front steps of City Hall. Mayor John H. Siegel and a few others tried to calm the mob and urged the men to let federal authorities deal with Prager. Siegel said if the man was a German spy, federal investigators might gain important information. Attacking Siegel and other officials for German ancestry, the mob accused them of being pro-German, too. During the time the mob was in front of City Hall, there had reportedly been an ineffective attempt by police officers to take Prager away. Unable to find a way to leave the building secretly, they removed Prager from the locked cell and hid him among sewer tiles in the basement. At about the same time, the mayor was told that Prager had been taken from the building by federal authorities, and he announced that to the mob. But many in the mob asked to search the building themselves. Believing Prager had been taken away, Mayor Siegel agreed. In this search, two members of the mob located Prager and took him back to the remnants of the mob, which had moved back to Main Street.

Lynching
The mob forced Prager to walk west on Main Street and the St. Louis Road, beating and harassing him. He had to sing patriotic songs and kiss the flag. When the mob arrived at the top of Bluff Hill, on the St. Louis Road overlooking St. Louis, some men took a car to get tar from a nearby streetcar stop. They intended to tar and feather Prager, as they had other targets of their wrath. But the men returned, not having been able to find any tar. Joe Reigel (also of German ancestry), 28, one of the two men to find Prager at city hall, had taken a leading role since then. He found a length of manila rope in one of the cars, and announced that Prager should hang. Other men were initially reluctant, but no one spoke out in the crowd.

Prager was allowed to write a last note to his parents in Dresden, Germany: 

He was hanged in front of a mob of 100 to 200 people, mostly men, at about 12:30 am on April 5, 1918.

Investigation
Prager's death was first investigated by Madison County Coroner Roy Lowe. His Coroner's Jury interviewed dozens of witnesses and on April 11 charged five men with murder. They were:
Joe Riegel, 28; Wesley Beaver, 26; Richard Dukes, 22; William Brockmeier, 41; and Enid Elmore, 21.

Riegel gave a remarkably candid confession to the Coroner's Jury about his role in the night's events. He also gave a full account to a reporter from the St. Louis Post-Dispatch.

A grand jury for Madison County, Illinois, was convened to hear testimony in the case. On April 25 they indicted the five men previously charged, and seven others for the murder of Prager. Additional suspects included: Charles Cranmer, 20; James DeMatties, 18; Frank Flannery, 19; Calvin Gilmore, 44; John Hallworth, 43; and Cecil Larremore, 17. The twelfth man to be indicted, George Davis, was never further identified, or located. He was not prosecuted.

The grand jury also indicted four Collinsville police officers for omission of duty and nonfeasance, for their failure to protect Prager from the mob. He had not been charged with any crime when taken into custody.

Trial and reaction
The trial began on May 13, 1918. More than 700 prospective jurors were reviewed by attorneys during the next two weeks to choose the 12 men who would serve. Deputy sheriffs were sent throughout the county picking eligible jurors. The judge refused to let the defense counsel try to demonstrate that Prager was disloyal. The case for the defendants was based on three principal claims: no one could say who did what, half the defendants claimed they had not been at the murder, and the rest claimed they had been bystanders. This defense was used by Joe Riegel, who had previously confessed his part in the affair.

In its concluding statements, the defense argued that Prager's lynching was justified by "unwritten law", which does not allow unpatriotic talk. After five days of statements and testimony, the case went to the jury on June 1, 1918. After deliberating 10 minutes, the jury found all the defendants to be innocent. One juryman reportedly shouted, "Well, I guess nobody can say we aren't loyal now". The prosecuting attorney dropped charges against the four policemen and George Davis, the defendant who had never been found.

A week after the trial, editor and publisher J.O. Monroe wrote an editorial in the Collinsville Herald, saying, 
"Outside of a few persons who may still harbor Germanic inclinations, the whole city is glad that the eleven men indicted for the hanging of Robert P. Prager were acquitted." And further, "the community is well convinced that he was disloyal.... The city does not miss him. The lesson of his death has had a wholesome effect on the Germanists of Collinsville and the rest of the nation."

A New York Times editorial said, "The new unwritten law appears to be that any group of men may execute justice, or what they consider justice, in any case growing out of the war." The Chicago Daily Tribune editorialized: “The lynching of Prager was reprehensible enough in itself, but the effort to excuse it as an act of ‘popular justice’ is worse.” The St. Louis Star noted that men were acquitted of lynching while American troops fought for democracy abroad: 
“We must save our own soul as a nation. We cannot let ourselves go in such a way as was done in the Prager outrage and hold up our heads as civilized people. We are battling for right and humanity and should exhibit those qualities ourselves or be open to the charge of hypocrisy. We cannot successfully battle the Hun if we are to become the Hun ourselves.”

See also
 Anti-German sentiment
Lynching of Olli Kinkkonen

Footnotes

Further reading
 Donald R. Hickey, "The Prager Affair: A Study in Wartime Hysteria," Journal of the Illinois State Historical Society, vol. 62, no. 2 (Summer 1969), pp. 117–134. In JSTOR
 E.A. Schwartz, "The Lynching of Robert Prager, the United Mine Workers, and the Problems of Patriotism in 1918," Journal of the Illinois State Historical Society, vol. 95, no. 4 (Winter 2003), pp. 414–437. In JSTOR
 Carl R. Weinberg, Labor, Loyalty, and Rebellion: Southwestern Illinois Coal Miners and World War I. Carbondale, IL: Southern Illinois University Press, 2005.
 Peter Stehman, Patriotic Murder: A World War I Hate Crime for Uncle Sam. Lincoln, NE: Potomac Books, 2018.
Erik Kirschbaum, Burning Beethoven: The Eradication of German Culture in the United States during World War I. New York, NY: Berlinica, 2015.

External links
1918 Lynching of Robert Prager, Collection of contemporary newspaper accounts by Stephen Davies, Dept of History, VIU
Lynching of Robert Prager, SIUE

1888 births
1918 deaths
German emigrants to the United States
People from Collinsville, Illinois
American coal miners
Anti-German sentiment in the United States
People murdered in Illinois
Male murder victims
Lynching deaths in Illinois
People from Dresden
Racially motivated violence against European Americans